Azerbaijan State Oil and Industrial University (formerly Azerbaijan State Oil Academy) is a tertiary education institution in Baku, Azerbaijan.

History 
The rise of what became ASOIU is tied to the rise of the petroleum industry in the Baku region. By 1887 the preparatory technical school that would become Baku Polytechnicum was established in Baku. By 1910 it had integrated a curriculum related to the growing oil industry. However, the ratio of Azerbaijanis to non-Azerbaijanis was so skewed that, of the 494 students studying at the school in 1916, only 20 were Azeri. On November 14, 1920, after the invasion of the Red Army and the establishment of the fledgling Azerbaijan SSR, the new government decreed that Baku Polytechnicum would close and be replaced by Baku Polytechnical Institute, a more traditional polytechnic institute and the beginnings of the current incarnation. The new school focused on training engineers in a broad range of industries, from agriculture to oil. By 1923 the school graduated its first three students; by 1927 it had risen to 289 graduates.

The new school went through many name changes over the years as its emphasis changed to meet the needs of Azerbaijan. In 1923 the school changed its name to Azerbaijan Polytechnical Institute. In 1929 the agriculture department was spun off into a separate Agriculture Institute and the university changed its name to the Azerbaijan Oil Institute (AOI) in 1930. However, the expanding need for engineers in areas outside oil resulted in expansion in the school's curriculum. The school changed names again in 1934, this time to the Azerbaijan Industrial Institute (Az.I.I.).

World War II taxed the Soviet Union and schools like Az.I.I. struggled to stay open. At the end of the war, there was great demand for oil engineers in the Soviet Union and the school trained them in great numbers. In 1952, the government founded a separate Azerbaijan Polytechnical Institute and moved much of the non-petrochemical curricula to the new school so that Az.I.I. could focus on the oil industry. On February 12, 1959, the school was renamed the Azerbaijan Oil and Chemistry Institute (AzOCI). In the early 1960s an evening program was developed. This program developed into its own, separate public university in 1992, reusing the name Azerbaijan Industrial Institute and becoming Sumgait State University. On March 21, 1992, after the independence of Azerbaijan from the Soviet Union, the university changed its name to the current ASOIU.

In 1993 the school changed its curricula into a more Western model, with its first bachelor's and master's degree candidates graduating in 1999.

By the decree of the president, the university was named the Azerbaijan State Oil and Industrial University in 2015.

Shooting spree 

On April 30, 2009, a shooting spree occurred at the academy in which thirteen people were killed. The perpetrator was Farda Gadirov, a Georgian citizen of Azerbaijani descent.

Campus 
The campus is on Azadlıq Prospekti (Liberty Avenue) in Baku.

Organization and administration 
The university is run by a management body of prorectors, supervised by the Scientific Council and the rector Mustafa Babanli.

Academic profile 
The Academy has eight faculties – Geology and Exploration Faculty, Gas, Petroleum and Mining Faculty, Chemical Technologies Faculty, Petro-mechanics Faculty, Energetics Faculty, Automatization of Production Processes Faculty, Engineering Economics, International Economic Relationships and Management Faculty and the Institute for Specialization and Re-education of Workforce for Industrial Organizations.

Since the breakup of the Soviet Union, ASOA has worked with a dozen Western universities to Westernize and modernize its programs, in particular with Georgia State University to develop a modern Master of Business Administration program.

ASOA trains students in more than 50 fields: geological engineering, computer sciences, metallurgical engineering, hydrogeology engineering, geophysics engineering, mountain-mining engineering, petroleum and gas constructions engineering, heating energetics engineering, equipment production engineering, technology machinery and apparatus engineering, electrical engineering, electronics, communication and radiotechnics engineering, mechatronics and robotechnology engineering, mechanical engineering, information technology and systems engineering, re-manufacturing and repair engineering, metrology, standardization and certification engineering, chemical engineering, petroleum and gas engineering, automatization engineering, management, engineering economics, marketing and so on.

Awards 
In 1931, the university received “Order of the Red Banner of Labor of the Azerbaijan SSR” and in 1940, it received “Order of the Red Banner of Labor”.

Student life

Sport 
The Academy has its own sports complex with swimming pool, tennis courts and all-weather football pitch. The "Neftçi" (~"Oilers") run teams in 12 sports including football, swimming, handball, basketball, athletics, judo, boxing and wrestling.

Notable people

Alumni

 Vagit Alekperov, President of the Russian oil company LUKOIL
 Heydar Aliyev, President of Azerbaijan from June 1993 to October 2003
 Nikolai Baibakov, head of Gosplan (State Committee for Planning) of the USSR
 Lavrentiy Beria, chief of the Soviet security and secret police apparatus under Joseph Stalin
 Rustam Ibrahimbeyov, screenwriter
 Kerim Kerimov, head of Soviet space program
 Alish Lambaranski, ex-mayor of Baku
 Sabit Orujov, minister of the gas industry of the USSR
 Artur Rasizade, Prime Minister of Azerbaijan
 Farman Salmanov, geologist
 Fazila Samadova, academic, chemical engineer-technologist
 José Eduardo dos Santos, President of Angola from September 1979 to September 2017
 Vitaly Zholobov, Soviet cosmonaut who flew on Soyuz 21
 Parviz Shahbazov, Minister of Energy of Azerbaijan Republic
 Tofig Aghahuseynov, Commander of the Baku Air Defense District

Faculty 
 Igor Kurchatov, Research Assistant at the Faculty of Physics (1924–1925)

Affiliations 
The academy is a member of the Caucasus University Association.

International relations 
ASOIU's international relations are developed in the following areas:

 Preparation of specialists and scientific staff for foreign countries;
 The activity of professor-teacher staff in foreign science and education institutions, education of students, masters and post-graduate students;
 Participation in international educational programs;
 Bilateral cooperation with foreign universities;
 Cooperation with foreign missions in Baku;
 Cooperation with international companies;
 Collaboration with International Associations of Universities.

In 2015, by the presidential decree, the French-Azerbaijan University (UFAZ) was established. The students of this university have an opportunity to get a diploma form the University of Strasbourg.

ASOIU is cooperating with several foreign universities:

 Georgia State University (USA)
 Zigen University (Germany)
 Ploektti Oil and Gas University (Romania)
 Tronheim City Science and Technology University (Norway) 
 Russia's State Oil and Gas University (Russia) 
 Genuya University (Italy) 
 Nitsa Sofia-Antipolis University (France) 
 Athens National Technical University (Greece)
 Khazar State University of Technology and Engineering (Kazakhstan)

Foreign cooperation 
In 2017, “New Educational Trend” conference was held in Baku at the 11th Azerbaijan International Education Festival. During the conference “Memorandum of Understanding” between Azerbaijan State Oil and Industrial University and Poltava National Technical University.

On September 23, 2018, during the 65th anniversary of the China University of Petroleum (CUP), Mustafa Babanli the rector of ASOIU and Zhang Laibin the rector of the CUP signed a memorandum of cooperation in Beijing, China.

ASOIU signed cooperation contract with Inonu University of Turkey in 2018, which involves cooperation with higher educational institutions and organization in Turkey.

During the meeting with Dr. Abdolrahim Navehebrahim who is the chancellor of Kharazmi University of Islamic Republic of Iran, the cooperation contract was signed between universities in 2018.

On January 26, 2018, rector of ASOIU and Ambassador of Turkmenistan to Azerbaijan Mekan Ishanguliyev held a meeting. During the meeting, bilateral cooperation and friendship in educational field were discussed between the parties.

ASOIU have signed cooperation contracts with several foreign universities such as Malakand University (Pakistan), Poltava National Technical University (Ukraine), Northern (Arctic) Federal University (Russia). The university is establishing cooperation with Moscow State University (Russia).

Mir-Babayev M.F. Establishment of the first oil institute in Transcaucasia — «Reservoir», Canada, 2011, Volume 38, Issue 8, September, p. 31-37.

References

External links

Facebook Page

Fossil fuels in the Soviet Union
Petroleum engineering schools
Petroleum industry in Azerbaijan
Science and technology in Azerbaijan
Educational institutions established in 1920
1920 establishments in Russia